Hans Weiner (born 29 November 1950 in Neuenkirchen) is a German former footballer who played as a defender. He spent much of his career in Berlin, with three years at Tennis Borussia, and nine years in two spells at Hertha BSC. He also spent two years with Bayern Munich, where he had his greatest successes, winning two Bundesliga titles and appearing in the 1982 European Cup Final. He spent three years in the United States, playing for Chicago Sting. Since retiring, he runs a bar in Berlin, named Hanne am Zoo.

External links
 
 Weiner's bar
 NASL stats

1950 births
Living people
People from Steinfurt (district)
Sportspeople from Münster (region)
German footballers
Germany B international footballers
Association football defenders
Bundesliga players
Tennis Borussia Berlin players
Hertha BSC players
FC Bayern Munich footballers
North American Soccer League (1968–1984) players
North American Soccer League (1968–1984) indoor players
Chicago Sting (NASL) players
Footballers from North Rhine-Westphalia
West German footballers
West German expatriate footballers
West German expatriate sportspeople in the United States
Expatriate soccer players in the United States